The following species are recognised in the genus Begonia:

A

Begonia abbottii Urb.
Begonia abdullahpieei Kiew
Begonia aberrans Irmsch.
Begonia aborensis Dunn
Begonia acaulis Merr. & L.M.Perry
Begonia acclivis Coyle
Begonia acerifolia Kunth
Begonia aceroides Irmsch.
Begonia acetosa Vell.
Begonia acetosella Craib
Begonia acida Vell.
Begonia aconitifolia A.DC.
Begonia acuminatissima Merr.
Begonia acutifolia Jacq.
Begonia acutiloba Liebm.
Begonia acutitepala K.Y.Guan & D.K.Tian
Begonia adamsensis Magtoto & Rubite
Begonia adenodes Irmsch.
Begonia adenopoda Lem.
Begonia adenostegia Stapf
Begonia admirabilis Brade
Begonia adpressa Sosef
Begonia adscendens C.B.Clarke
Begonia aenea Linden & André
Begonia aequata A.Gray
Begonia aequatoguineensis Sosef & Nguema
Begonia aequatorialis L.B.Sm. & B.G.Schub.
Begonia aequilateralis Irmsch.
Begonia aeranthos L.B.Sm. & B.G.Schub.
Begonia affinis Merr.
Begonia aggeloptera N.Hallé
Begonia aguiabrancensis L.Kollmann
Begonia agusanensis Merr.
Begonia alba Merr.
Begonia albidula Brade
Begonia albobracteata Ridl.
Begonia albococcinea Hook.
Begonia albomaculata C.DC. ex Huber
Begonia × albopicta W.Bull
Begonia alcarrasica J.Sierra
Begonia alchemilloides A.DC.
Begonia algaia L.B.Sm. & Wassh.
Begonia alice-clarkae Ziesenh.
Begonia aliciae C.E.C.Fisch.
Begonia alicida C.B.Clarke
Begonia almedana Burt-Utley & Utley
Begonia alnifolia A.DC.
Begonia alpina L.B.Sm. & Wassh.
Begonia altamiroi Brade
Begonia altissima Ridl.
Begonia altoperuviana A.DC.
Begonia alvarezii Merr.
Begonia alveolata T.T.Yu
Begonia × amabilis Linden
Begonia amphioxus Sands
Begonia ampla Hook.f.
Begonia anaimalaiensis Bedd.
Begonia andamensis Parish ex C.B.Clarke
Begonia andersonii Kiew & S.Julia
Begonia andina Rusby
Begonia androrangensis Humbert
Begonia androturba Coyle
Begonia anemoniflora Irmsch.
Begonia angilogensis Merr.
Begonia angolensis Irmsch.
Begonia angraensis Brade
Begonia angularis Raddi
Begonia angulata Vell.
Begonia angustilimba Merr.
Begonia angustiloba A.DC.
Begonia anisoptera Merr.
Begonia anisosepala Hook.f.
Begonia anjuanensis Humbert ex Aymonin & Bosser
Begonia ankaranensis Humbert ex Aymonin & Bosser
Begonia annobonensis A.DC.
Begonia annulata K.Koch
Begonia anodifolia A.DC.
Begonia antaisaka Humbert
Begonia anthonyi Kiew
Begonia × antonietae Brade
Begonia antongilensis Humbert
Begonia antsingyensis Humbert ex Aymonin & Bosser
Begonia antsiranensis Aymonin & Bosser
Begonia apayaoensis Merr.
Begonia apparicioi Brade
Begonia aptera Blume
Begonia arachnoidea C.I Peng, Yan Liu & S.M.Ku
Begonia arborescens Raddi
Begonia arboreta Y.M.Shui
Begonia archboldiana Merr. & L.M.Perry
Begonia areolata Miq.
Begonia arfakensis (Gibbs) L.L.Forrest & Hollingsw.
Begonia argentea Linden
Begonia argenteomarginata Tebbitt
Begonia aridicaulis Ziesenh.
Begonia arnottiana (Wight) A.DC.
Begonia arrogans Irmsch.
Begonia articulata Irmsch.
Begonia artior Irmsch.
Begonia asperifolia Irmsch.
Begonia aspleniifolia Hook.f. ex A.DC.
Begonia assurgens Irmsch. ex Weberling
Begonia asteropyrifolia Y.M.Shui & W.H.Chen
Begonia asympeltata L.B.Sm. & Wassh.
Begonia atricha (Miq.) Miq. ex A.DC.
Begonia atroglandulosa Sosef
Begonia augustae Irmsch.
Begonia augustinei Hemsl.
Begonia aurantiflora C.I Peng, Yan Liu & S.M.Ku
Begonia auriculata Hook.f.
Begonia auritistipula Y.M.Shui & W.H.Chen
Begonia austroguangxiensis Y.M.Shui & W.H.Chen
Begonia austrotaiwanensis Y.K.Chen & C.I.Peng
Begonia awongii Sands
Begonia axillaris Ridl.
Begonia axillipara Ridl.
Begonia azuensis Urb. & Ekman

B

Begonia baccata Hook.f.
Begonia bagotiana Humbert ex Aymonin & Bosser
Begonia bahakensis Sands
Begonia bahiensis A.DC.
Begonia balangcodiae Rubite, S.H.Liu & K.F.Chung
Begonia balansae C.DC.
Begonia balansana Gagnep.
Begonia baliensis Girm.
Begonia balmisiana Balmis
Begonia bamaensis Yan Liu & C.I Peng
Begonia banaoensis J.Sierra
Begonia bangii Kuntze
Begonia bangsamoro D.P.Buenavista
Begonia baramensis Merr.
Begonia barbellata Ridl.
Begonia barborkae Halda
Begonia barkeri Knowles & Westc.
Begonia barkleyana L.B.Sm.
Begonia baronii Baker
Begonia barrigae L.B.Sm. & B.G.Schub.
Begonia bartlettiana Merr. & L.M.Perry
Begonia bataiensis Kiew
Begonia baturongensis Kiew
Begonia baumannii Lemoine ex Wittm.
Begonia baviensis Gagnep.
Begonia beccariana Ridl.
Begonia beccarii Warb.
Begonia beddomei Hook.f.
Begonia beijnenii
Begonia bekopakensis Aymonin & Bosser
Begonia bequaertii Robyns & Lawalrée
Begonia berhamanii Kiew
Begonia bernicei Aymard & G.A.Romero
Begonia bernieri A.DC.
Begonia beryllae Ridl.
Begonia besleriifolia Schott
Begonia betsimisaraka Humbert
Begonia bettinae Ziesenh.
Begonia bidentata Raddi
Begonia biflora T.C.Ku
Begonia bifolia Ridl.
Begonia bifurcata L.B.Sm. & B.G.Schub.
Begonia biguassuensis Brade
Begonia biliranensis Merr.
Begonia binuangensis Merr.
Begonia bipinnatifida J.J.Sm.
Begonia biserrata Lindl.
Begonia bissei J.Sierra
Begonia blancii M.Hughes & C.I Peng
Begonia bogneri Ziesenh.
Begonia boisiana Gagnep.
Begonia boissieri A.DC.
Begonia boiviniana A.DC.
Begonia boliviensis A.DC.
Begonia bolleana Urb. & Ekman
Begonia bolsteri Merr.
Begonia bonii Gagnep.
Begonia bonitoensis Brade
Begonia bonthainensis Hemsl.
Begonia bonus-henricus J.J.de Wilde
Begonia boraceiensis Handro
Begonia borneensis A.DC.
Begonia bosseri Keraudren
Begonia boucheana (Klotzsch) A.DC.
Begonia bouffordii C.I Peng
Begonia bowerae Ziesenh.
Begonia brachybotrys Merr. & L.M.Perry
Begonia brachyclada Urb. & Ekman
Begonia brachypoda O.E.Schulz
Begonia bracteata Jack
Begonia bracteosa A.DC.
Begonia bradei Irmsch.
Begonia brandbygeana L.B.Sm. & Wassh.
Begonia brandisiana Kurz
Begonia brassii Merr. & L.M.Perry
Begonia breedlovei Burt-Utley
Begonia brevibracteata Kupicha
Begonia brevicaulis A.DC.
Begonia brevicordata L.B.Sm. & B.G.Schub.
Begonia brevilobata Irmsch.
Begonia brevipedunculata Y.M.Shui
Begonia brevipes Merr.
Begonia brevipetala (A.DC.) Warb.
Begonia brevirimosa Irmsch.
Begonia × breviscapa C.I Peng, Yan Liu & S.M.Ku
Begonia brevisetulosa C.Y.Wu
Begonia bridgesii A.DC.
Begonia bruneiana Sands
Begonia buchtienii Irmsch.
Begonia buddleiifolia A.DC.
Begonia bufoderma L.B.Sm. & Wassh.
Begonia buimontana Yamam.
Begonia bulbillifera Link & Otto
Begonia bullata Urb. & Ekman
Begonia bullatifolia L.Kollmann
Begonia burbidgei Stapf
Begonia burkillii Dunn
Begonia burmensis L.B.Sm. & Wassh.
Begonia burttii Kiew & S.Julia
Begonia buseyi Burt-Utley

C

Begonia cacauicola L.B.Sm. ex S.F.Sm. & Wassh.
Begonia caespitosa Jack
Begonia calcarea Ridl.
Begonia calcicola Merr.
Begonia calderonii Standl.
Begonia calliantha Merr. & L.M.Perry
Begonia callosa L.Kollmann
Begonia calvescens (Brade ex L.B.Sm. & R.C.Sm.) E.L.Jacques & Mamede
Begonia campanensis Burt-Utley & Utley
Begonia camposportoana Brade
Begonia canarana Miq.
Begonia candollei Ziesenh.
Begonia capanemae Brade
Begonia caparaoensis E.L.Jacques & L.Kollmann
Begonia capensis L.f.
Begonia capillipes Gilg
Begonia capituliformis Irmsch.
Begonia caraguatatubensis Rubite,R.R., M. Irabagon, D. Palacio, Y.P.Ang, & R.Bustam.
Begonia caramoanensis Brade
Begonia cardiocarpa Liebm.
Begonia cardiophora Irmsch.
Begonia cariocana Brade ex L.B.Sm. & Wassh.
Begonia carletonii Standl.
Begonia carnosa Teijsm. & Binn.
Begonia carnosula Ridl.
Begonia carolineifolia Regel
Begonia carpinifolia Liebm.
Begonia carrieae Ziesenh.
Begonia casiguranensis Quisumb. & Merr.
Begonia castaneifolia Otto & Dietr.
Begonia castilloi Merr.
Begonia catharinensis Brade
Begonia cathayana Hemsl.
Begonia cathcartii Hook.f. & Thomson
Begonia caudata Merr.
Begonia cauliflora Sands
Begonia cavaleriei H.Lév.
Begonia cavallyensis A.Chev.
Begonia cavum Ziesenh.
Begonia cebadillensis Houghton ex L.B.Sm. & Schub.
Begonia cehengensis T.C.Ku
Begonia celebica Irmsch.
Begonia cerasiphylla L.B.Sm. & Wassh.
Begonia ceratocarpa S.H.Huang & Y.M.Shui
Begonia chaetocarpa Kuntze
Begonia chaiana Kiew & S.Julia
Begonia chiapensis Burt-Utley
Begonia chiasmogyna M.Hughes
Begonia chingii Irmsch.
Begonia chishuiensis T.C.Ku
Begonia chitoensis Tang S.Liu & M.J.Lai
Begonia chivatoa Ziesenh.
Begonia chlorandra Sands
Begonia chlorocarpa Irmsch. ex Sands
Begonia chlorolepis L.B.Sm. & B.G.Schub.
Begonia chloroneura P.Wilkie & Sands
Begonia chlorosticta Sands
Begonia chongii Sands
Begonia × chungii C.I Peng & S.M.Ku
Begonia chuniana C.Y.Wu
Begonia chuyunshanensis C.I Peng & Y.K.Chen
Begonia ciliifera Merr.
Begonia ciliobracteata Warb.
Begonia cincinnifera Irmsch.
Begonia cinnabarina Hook.
Begonia circumlobata Hance
Begonia cirrosa L.B.Sm. & Wassh.
Begonia cladocarpoides Humbert ex Aymonin & Bosser
Begonia cladotricha M.Hughes
Begonia clarkei Hook.f.
Begonia clavicaulis Irmsch.
Begonia clemensiae Merr. & L.M.Perry
Begonia cleopatrae Coyle
Begonia clypeifolia Hook.f.
Begonia coccinea Hook.
Begonia coelocentroides Y.M.Shui & Z.D.Wei
Begonia cognata Irmsch.
Begonia collaris Brade
Begonia collina Irmsch.
Begonia collisiae Merr.
Begonia colombiana L.B.Sm. & B.G.Schub.
Begonia colorata Warb.
Begonia comata Kuntze
Begonia comestibilis D.C.Thomas & Ardi
Begonia comorensis Warb.
Begonia compacticaulis Irmsch.
Begonia concanensis A.DC.
Begonia conchifolia A.Dietr.
Begonia concinna Schott
Begonia confinis L.B.Sm. & Wassh.
Begonia confusa L.B.Sm. & B.G.Schub.
Begonia congesta Ridl.
Begonia conipila Irmsch. ex Kiew
Begonia consanguinea Merr.
Begonia consobrina Irmsch.
Begonia contracta Warb.
Begonia convallariodora C.DC.
Begonia convolvulacea (Klotzsch) A.DC.
Begonia cooperi C.DC.
Begonia copelandii Merr.
Begonia copeyana C.DC.
Begonia coptidifolia H.G.Ye, F.G.Wang, Y.S.Ye & C.I Peng
Begonia coptidimontana C.Y.Wu
Begonia cordata Vell.
Begonia cordifolia (Wight) Thwaites
Begonia coriacea Hassk.
Begonia corneri Kiew
Begonia cornitepala Irmsch.
Begonia cornuta L.B.Sm. & B.G.Schub.
Begonia coronensis Merr.
Begonia corredorana C.DC.
Begonia corrugata Kiew & S.Julia
Begonia corzoensis Ziesenh.
Begonia coursii Humbert ex Aymonin
Begonia cowellii Nash
Begonia crassicaulis Lindl.
Begonia crateris Exell
Begonia crenata Dryand.
Begonia crinita Oliv. ex Hook.f.
Begonia crispipila Elmer
Begonia crispula Brade
Begonia cristata Warb. ex L.B.Sm. & Wassh.
Begonia cristobalensis Ziesenh.
Begonia croatii Burt-Utley
Begonia crocea C.I Peng
Begonia cryptocarpa L.B.Sm. & B.G.Schub.
Begonia crystallina Y.M.Shui & W.H.Chen
Begonia cuatrecasana L.B.Sm. & B.G.Schub.
Begonia cubensis Hassk.
Begonia cucphuongensis H.Q.Nguyen & Tebbitt
Begonia cucullata Willd.
Begonia cucurbitifolia C.Y.Wu
Begonia cuernavacensis Ziesenh.
Begonia cumingiana (Klotzsch) A.DC.
Begonia cumingii A.Gray
Begonia cuneatifolia Irmsch.
Begonia cupreata Henriq.
Begonia curtii L.B.Sm. & B.G.Schub.
Begonia curtisii Ridl.
Begonia curvicarpa S.M.Ku, C.I Peng & Yan Liu
Begonia cyanescens Sands
Begonia cyathophora Poepp. & Endl.
Begonia cylindrata L.B.Sm. & B.G.Schub.
Begonia cylindrica D.R.Liang & X.X.Chen
Begonia cymbalifera L.B.Sm. & B.G.Schub.

D

Begonia davisii Burbridge
Begonia daweishanensis S.H.Huang & Y.M.Shui
Begonia daxinensis T.C.Ku
Begonia dealbata Liebm.
Begonia debaoensis C.I Peng, Yan Liu & S.M.Ku
Begonia debilis King
Begonia decandra Pav. ex A.DC.
Begonia decaryana Humbert ex Aymonin & Bosser
Begonia declinata Vell.
Begonia decora Stapf
Begonia delicata Gregório & J.A.S. Costa
Begonia delicatula Parish ex C.B.Clarke
Begonia demissa Craib
Begonia densifolia Irmsch.
Begonia densiretis Irmsch.
Begonia dentatiloba A.DC.
Begonia dentatobracteata C.Y.Wu
Begonia denticulata Kunth
Begonia depauperata Schott
Begonia descoleana L.B.Sm. & B.G.Schub.
Begonia dewildei Sosef
Begonia dichotoma Jacq.
Begonia didyma D.C.Thomas & Ardi
Begonia dielsiana E.Pritz. ex Diels
Begonia dietrichiana Irmsch.
Begonia diffusa L.B.Sm. & B.G.Schub.
Begonia diffusiflora Merr. & L.M.Perry
Begonia digitata Raddi
Begonia digyna Irmsch.
Begonia dinhdui Craib
Begonia dioica Buch.-Ham. ex D.Don
Begonia dipetala Graham
Begonia discrepans Irmsch.
Begonia discreta Craib
Begonia divaricata Irmsch.
Begonia diversistipulata Irmsch.
Begonia diwolii Kiew
Begonia djamuensis Irmsch.
Begonia dodsonii L.B.Sm. & Wassh.
Begonia dolichotricha Merr.
Begonia domingensis A.DC.
Begonia donkelaariana Lem.
Begonia dosedlae Gilli
Begonia dregei Otto & Dietr.
Begonia dressleri Burt-Utley
Begonia droopiae Ardi
Begonia dryadis Irmsch.
Begonia duclouxii Gagnep.
Begonia dugandiana L.B.Sm. & B.G.Schub.
Begonia duncan-thomasii Sosef
Begonia dux C.B.Clarke

E

Begonia eberhardtii Gagnep.
Begonia ebolowensis Engl.
Begonia echinosepala Regel
Begonia eciliata O.E.Schulz
Begonia edanoi Merr.
Begonia edmundoi Brade
Begonia edulis H.Lév.
Begonia egregia N.E.Br.
Begonia eiromischa Ridl.
Begonia elaeagnifolia Hook.f.
Begonia elastotemmoides Hook. f.
Begonia elatostematoides Merr.
Begonia elatostemma Ridl.
Begonia elatostemmoides Hook.f.
Begonia elianeae Gregório & J.A.S. Costa
Begonia eliassii Warb.
Begonia elisabethae Kiew
Begonia elmeri Merr.
Begonia elnidoensis C.I Peng, Rubite & C.W.Lin
Begonia emeiensis C.M.Hu
Begonia eminii Warb.
Begonia engleri Gilg
Begonia epibaterium Mart. ex A.DC.
Begonia epipsila Brade
Begonia erecta Vell.
Begonia erectocaulis Sosef
Begonia erectotricha Sosef
Begonia erminea L'Hér.
Begonia erythrocarpa A.DC.
Begonia erythrogyna Sands
Begonia esculenta Merr.
Begonia espiritosantensis E.L.Jacques & Mamede
Begonia estrellensis C.DC.
Begonia euryphylla L.B.Sm. ex S.F.Sm. & Wassh.
Begonia eutricha Sands
Begonia everettii Merr.
Begonia exalata C.DC.
Begonia exigua Irmsch.
Begonia exilis O.E.Schulz
Begonia extensa L.B.Sm. & B.G.Schub.
Begonia extranea L.B.Sm. & B.G.Schub.

F

Begonia fabulosa L.B.Sm. & Wassh.
Begonia fagifolia Fisch.
Begonia falcifolia Hook.f.
Begonia falciloba Liebm.
Begonia fangii Y.M.Shui & C.I Peng
Begonia fasciculata Jack
Begonia fasciculiflora Merr.
Begonia faustinoi Burt-Utley & Utley
Begonia fellereriana Irmsch.
Begonia fengii T.C.Ku
Begonia fenicis Merr.
Begonia fernaldiana L.B.Sm. & B.G.Schub.
Begonia fernandoi-costae Irmsch.
Begonia ferox C.-I Peng & Yan Liu 
Begonia ferramica N.Hallé
Begonia ferruginea L.f.
Begonia festiva Craib
Begonia fibrosa C.B.Clarke
Begonia fiebrigii C.DC.
Begonia filibracteosa Irmsch.
Begonia filiformis Irmsch.
Begonia fimbriata Liebm.
Begonia fimbribracteata Y.M.Shui & W.H.Chen
Begonia fimbristipula Hance
Begonia fischeri Schrank
Begonia fissistyla Irmsch.
Begonia flacca Irmsch.
Begonia flaccidissima Kurz
Begonia flagellaris H.Hara
Begonia flaviflora H.Hara
Begonia flexicaulis Ridl.
Begonia flexula Ridl.
Begonia floccifera Bedd.
Begonia fluminensis Brade
Begonia foliosa Kunth
Begonia forbesii King
Begonia fordii Irmsch.
Begonia forgetiana Hemsl.
Begonia formosana (Hayata) Masam.
Begonia formosissima Sandwith
Begonia forrestii Irmsch.
Begonia fortunensis Burt-Utley & Utley
Begonia foveolata Irmsch.
Begonia foxworthyi Burkill ex Ridl.
Begonia francisiae Ziesenh.
Begonia francoisii Guillaumin
Begonia fraseri Kiew
Begonia friburgensis Brade
Begonia froebelii A.DC.
Begonia fruticella Ridl.
Begonia fruticosa (Klotzsch) A.DC.
Begonia fuchsiiflora (A.DC.) A.I.Baranov & F.A.Barkley
Begonia fuchsioides Hook.
Begonia fulgurata Peng, C.-I; Lin, C.-W.; Phutthai, T.
Begonia fulvosetulosa Brade
Begonia fulvovillosa Warb.
Begonia furfuracea Hook.f.
Begonia fusca Liebm.
Begonia fuscisetosa Sands
Begonia fuscocaulis Brade
Begonia fusialata Warb.
Begonia fusibulba C.DC.
Begonia fusicarpa Irmsch.

G

Begonia gabonensis J.J.de Wilde
Begonia gagnepainiana Irmsch.
Begonia gamolepis L.B.Sm. & B.G.Schub.
Begonia garagarana C.DC.
Begonia gardneri A.DC.
Begonia garrettii Craib
Begonia garuvae L.B.Sm. & R.C.Sm.
Begonia gehrtii Irmsch.
Begonia gemella Warb. ex L.B.Sm. & Wassh.
Begonia geminiflora L.B.Sm. & Wassh.
Begonia gemmipara Hook.f. & Thomson
Begonia gemmirhiza H.Lév.
Begonia gentilii De Wild.
Begonia geoffrayi Gagnep.
Begonia georgei Coyle
Begonia geraniifolia Hook.
Begonia geranioides Hook.f.
Begonia gesnerioides L.B.Sm. & B.G.Schub.
Begonia gibbsiae Irmsch. ex Sands
Begonia gigabracteata Hong Z.Li & H.Ma
Begonia gigaphylla Y.M.Shui & W.H.Chen
Begonia gilgiana Irmsch.
Begonia gironellae C.I Peng & Rubite & C.W.Lin
Begonia gitingensis Elmer
Begonia glaberrima Urb. & Ekman
Begonia glabra Aubl.
Begonia glabricaulis Irmsch.
Begonia glandulifera Griseb.
Begonia glandulosa A.DC. ex Hook.
Begonia glauca (Klotzsch) Ruiz & Pav. ex A.DC.
Begonia glaucoides Irmsch.
Begonia glechomifolia C.M.Hu
Begonia glutinosa Kiew
Begonia goegoensis N.E.Br.
Begonia goldingiana L.Kollmann & A.P.Fontana
Begonia gomantongensis Kiew
Begonia goniotis C.B.Clarke
Begonia gorgonea Tebbitt
Begonia gossweileri Irmsch.
Begonia goudotii A.DC.
Begonia gracilicyma Irmsch. ex M.Hughes
Begonia gracilior Burt-Utley & McVaugh
Begonia gracilipes Merr.
Begonia gracilis Kunth
Begonia gracillima A.DC.
Begonia grandipetala Irmsch.
Begonia grandis Dryand.
Begonia grantiana Craib
Begonia grata Geddes
Begonia griffithiana (A.DC.) Warb.
Begonia grisea A.DC.
Begonia groenewegensis K.Koch & Fint.
Begonia guaduensis Kunth
Begonia guangxiensis C.Y.Wu
Begonia guaniana H.Ma & Hong Z.Li
Begonia guatemalensis Van Houtte ex Galeotti
Begonia gueritziana Gibbs
Begonia guishanensis S.H.Huang & Y.M.Shui
Begonia gulinqingensis S.H.Huang & Y.M.Shui
Begonia gungshanensis C.Y.Wu
Begonia gunnerifolia Linden & André
Begonia gutierrezii Coyle
Begonia guttapila D.C.Thomas & Ardi
Begonia guttata Wall. ex A.DC.

H

Begonia hahiepiana H.Q.Nguyen & Tebbitt
Begonia hainanensis Chun & F.Chun
Begonia halconensis Merr.
Begonia handelii Irmsch.
Begonia handroi Brade
Begonia haniffii Burkill
Begonia harlingii L.B.Sm. & Wassh.
Begonia harmandii Gagnep.
Begonia hasskarliana (Miq.) Miq. ex A.DC.
Begonia hassleri C.DC.
Begonia hatacoa Buch.-Ham. ex D.Don
Begonia havilandii Ridl.
Begonia hayamiana Nob.Tanaka
Begonia hayatae Gagnep.
Begonia hekensis D.C.Thomas
Begonia hekouensis S.H.Huang
Begonia heliostrophe Kiew
Begonia hemsleyana Hook.f.
Begonia henryi Hemsl.
Begonia heracleifolia Cham. & Schltdl.
Begonia herbacea Vell.
Begonia heringeri Brade
Begonia hernandioides Merr.
Begonia herrerae L.B.Sm. & B.G.Schub.
Begonia herteri Irmsch.
Begonia herveyana King
Begonia heterochroma Sosef
Begonia heteroclinis Miq. ex Koord.
Begonia heteropoda Baker
Begonia hexandra Irmsch.
Begonia hexaptera Sands
Begonia heydei C.DC.
Begonia hidirii Tawan, Ipor & Meekiong
Begonia hilariana A.DC.
Begonia hintoniana L.B.Sm. & B.G.Schub.
Begonia hirsuta Aubl.
Begonia hirsuticaulis Irmsch.
Begonia hirsutula Hook.f.
Begonia hirta (Klotzsch) L.B.Sm. & B.G.Schub.
Begonia hirtella Link
Begonia hispida Schott ex A.DC.
Begonia hispidissima Zipp. ex Koord.
Begonia hispidivillosa Ziesenh.
Begonia hitchcockii Irmsch.
Begonia hoehneana Irmsch.
Begonia holmnielseniana L.B.Sm. & Wassh.
Begonia holosericea Teijsm. & Binn.
Begonia holtonis A.DC.
Begonia holttumii Irmsch.
Begonia homonyma Steud.
Begonia hondurensis Burt-Utley & Utley
Begonia hongkongensis F.W.Xing
Begonia hookeriana Gardner
Begonia horsfieldii (Miq.) Miq. ex A.DC.
Begonia horticola Irmsch.
Begonia houttuynioides T.T.Yu
Begonia howii Merr. & Chun
Begonia huangii Y.M.Shui & W.H.Chen
Begonia hubertii Ziesenh.
Begonia huegelii (Klotzsch) A.DC.
Begonia hullettii Ridl.
Begonia humbertii Keraudren
Begonia humboldtiana Gibbs
Begonia humericola Sands
Begonia humilicaulis Irmsch.
Begonia humilis Aiton
Begonia humillima L.B.Sm. & Wassh.
Begonia hydrocotylifolia Otto ex Hook.
Begonia hydrophylloides L.B.Sm. & B.G.Schub.
Begonia hymenocarpa C.Y.Wu
Begonia hymenophylla Gagnep.
Begonia hymenophylloides F.K.Ward ex L.B.Sm. & Wassh.

I

Begonia ibitiocensis E.L.Jacques & Mamede
Begonia ignea (Klotzsch) Warsz. ex A.DC.
Begonia ignorata Irmsch.
Begonia imbricata Sands
Begonia imitans Irmsch.
Begonia imperfecta Irmsch.
Begonia imperialis Lem.
Begonia incarnata Link & Otto
Begonia incerta Craib
Begonia incisa A.DC.
Begonia incisoserrata (Klotzsch) A.DC.
Begonia incondita Craib
Begonia inconspicua Brade
Begonia inculta Irmsch.
Begonia inostegia Stapf
Begonia insueta D.C.Thomas & Ardi
Begonia insularis Brade
Begonia insularum Irmsch.
Begonia integerrima Spreng.
Begonia integrifolia Dalzell
Begonia intermixta Irmsch.
Begonia inversa Irmsch.
Begonia involucrata Liebm.
Begonia ionophylla Irmsch.
Begonia iridescens Dunn
Begonia irmscheri L.B.Sm. & B.G.Schub.
Begonia isabelensis Quisumb. & Merr.
Begonia isalensis Humbert ex Aymonin & Bosser
Begonia isoptera Dryand. ex Sm.
Begonia isopterocarpa Irmsch.
Begonia isopteroidea King
Begonia itaguassuensis Brade
Begonia itapavensis Brade
Begonia itatiaiensis Brade
Begonia itatinensis Irmsch. ex Brade
Begonia iucunda Irmsch.

J

Begonia jagorii Warb.
Begonia jaliscana Burt-Utley
Begonia jamaicensis A.DC.
Begonia jarmilae Halda
Begonia jayaensis Kiew
Begonia jenmanii Tutin
Begonia jiewhoei Kiew
Begonia jingxiensis D.Fang & Y.G.Wei
Begonia jocelinoi Brade
Begonia johnstonii Oliv. ex Hook.f.
Begonia josephi A.DC.
Begonia juliana Loefgr. ex Irmsch.
Begonia juliasangii Kiew
Begonia juninensis Irmsch.
Begonia juntasensis Kuntze
Begonia jureiensis S.J.Gomes da Silva & Mamede

K

Begonia kachak K.G.Pearce
Begonia kachinensis Nob.Tanaka
Begonia kalabenonensis Humbert ex Aymonin & Bosser
Begonia kalbreyeri (Oliv.) L.B.Sm. & B.G.Schub.
Begonia kaniensis Irmsch.
Begonia karperi J.C.Arends
Begonia karwinskyana A.DC.
Begonia kasutensis K.G.Pearce
Begonia keeana Kiew
Begonia keithii Kiew
Begonia kelliana Irmsch.
Begonia kenworthyae Ziesenh.
Begonia keraudreniae Bosser
Begonia kerrii Craib
Begonia kerstingii Irmsch.
Begonia khasiana C.B.Clarke
Begonia kiamfeei Kiew & S.Julia
Begonia killipiana L.B.Sm. & B.G.Schub.
Begonia kinabaluensis Sands
Begonia kingdon-wardii Tebbitt
Begonia kingiana Irmsch.
Begonia kisuluana Büttner
Begonia klemmei Merr.
Begonia klossii Ridl.
Begonia knoopii Ziesenh.
Begonia koksunii Kiew
Begonia komoensis Irmsch.
Begonia konderreisiana L.B.Sm. & R.C.Sm.
Begonia koordersii Warb. ex L.B.Sm. & Wassh.
Begonia kortsiae Ziesenh.
Begonia kouytcheouensis Guillaumin
Begonia krystofii Halda
Begonia kuhlmannii Brade
Begonia kui C.I Peng
Begonia kunthiana Walp.
Begonia kurakura Tawan, Ipor & Meekiong

L

Begonia labordei H.Lév.
Begonia laccophora Sands
Begonia lacera Merr.
Begonia lacerata Irmsch.
Begonia lachaoensis Ziesenh.
Begonia lacunosa Warb.
Begonia laevis Ridl.
Begonia lagunensis Elmer
Begonia lailana Kiew & Geri
Begonia lambii Kiew
Begonia laminariae Irmsch.
Begonia lancangensis S.H.Huang(vi)
Begonia lanceolata Vell.
Begonia lancifolia Merr.
Begonia lancilimba Merr.
Begonia langbianensis Baker f.
Begonia lansbergeae L.Linden & Rodigas
Begonia lanstyakii Brade
Begonia lanternaria Irmsch.
Begonia laporteifolia Warb.
Begonia larorum L.B.Sm. & Wassh.
Begonia laruei M.Hughes
Begonia lasioura D.C.Thomas & Ardi
Begonia latistipula Merr.
Begonia lauterbachii Warb.
Begonia laxa L.B.Sm. & B.G.Schub.
Begonia layang-layang Kiew
Begonia lazat Kiew & Reza Azmi
Begonia lealii Brade
Begonia leandrii Humbert ex Aymonin & Bosser
Begonia leathermaniae O'Reilly & Kareg.
Begonia lecomtei Gagnep.
Begonia ledermannii Irmsch.
Begonia lehmannii (Irmsch.) L.B.Sm. & B.G.Schub.
Begonia leivae J.Sierra
Begonia lempuyangensis Girm.
Begonia lemurica Keraudren
Begonia lengguanii Kiew
Begonia leopoldinensis L.Kollmann
Begonia lepida Blume
Begonia lepidella Ridl.
Begonia leprosa Hance
Begonia leptantha C.B.Rob.
Begonia leptoptera H.Hara
Begonia leptostyla Irmsch.
Begonia letestui J.J.de Wilde
Begonia letouzeyi Sosef
Begonia leucantha Ridl.
Begonia leucochlora Sands
Begonia leuconeura Urb. & Ekman
Begonia leucosticta Warb.
Begonia leucotricha Sands
Begonia libanensis Urb.
Begonia libera (L.B.Sm. & B.G.Schub.) L.B.Sm. & B.G.Schub.
Begonia lignescens Morton
Begonia limprichtii Irmsch.
Begonia lindleyana Walp.
Begonia lindmanii Brade
Begonia linearifolia J.Sierra
Begonia lineolata Brade
Begonia lipingensis Irmsch.
Begonia lipolepis L.B.Sm.
Begonia listada L.B.Sm. & Wassh.
Begonia lithophila C.Y.Wu
Begonia littleri Merr.
Begonia liuyanii C.I Peng, S.M.Ku & W.C.Leong
Begonia lobbii (Hassk.) A.DC.
Begonia loheri Merr.
Begonia lombokensis Girm.
Begonia lomensis Britton & Wilson
Begonia longanensis C.Y.Wu
Begonia longialata K.Y.Guan & D.K.Tian
Begonia longibarbata Brade
Begonia longibractea Merr.
Begonia longicarpa K.Y.Guan & D.K.Tian
Begonia longicaulis Ridl.
Begonia longifolia Blume
Begonia longimaculata Irmsch.
Begonia longinoda Merr.
Begonia longipedunculata Golding & Kareg.
Begonia longipetiolata Gilg
Begonia longirostris Benth.
Begonia longiscapa Warb.
Begonia longiseta Irmsch.
Begonia longistipula Merr.
Begonia longistyla Y.M.Shui & W.H.Chen
Begonia longivillosa A.DC.
Begonia lopensis Sosef & M.E.Leal
Begonia lophoptera Rolfe
Begonia loranthoides Hook.f.
Begonia lossiae L.Kollmann
Begonia louis-williamsii Burt-Utley
Begonia lowiana King
Begonia lubbersii E.Morren
Begonia lucidissima Golding & Kareg.
Begonia lucifuga Irmsch.
Begonia ludicra A.DC.
Begonia ludwigii Irmsch.
Begonia lugonis L.B.Sm. & Wassh.
Begonia lukuana Y.C.Liu & C.H.Ou
Begonia lunaris E.L.Jacques
Begonia lunatistyla Irmsch.
Begonia luochengensis S.M.Ku, C.I Peng & Yan Liu
Begonia lushaiensis C.E.C.Fisch.
Begonia lutea L.B.Sm. & B.G.Schub.
Begonia luxurians Scheidw.
Begonia luzhaiensis T.C.Ku
Begonia luzonensis Warb.
Begonia lyallii A.DC.
Begonia lyman-smithii Burt-Utley & Utley
Begonia lyniceorum Burt-Utley

M

Begonia macduffieana L.B.Sm. & B.G.Schub.
Begonia macgregorii Merr.
Begonia machrisiana L.B.Sm. & B.G.Schub.
Begonia macintyreana M.Hughes
Begonia macra A.DC.
Begonia macrocarpa Warb.
Begonia macrotis Vis.
Begonia macrotoma Irmsch.
Begonia maculata Raddi
Begonia madaiensis Kiew
Begonia madecassa Keraudren
Begonia maestrensis Urb.
Begonia magdalenae L.B.Sm. & B.G.Schub.
Begonia magdalenensis Brade
Begonia majungaensis Guillaumin
Begonia makrinii C.V. Morton ex Burt-Utley & K. Utley
Begonia malabarica Lam.
Begonia malachosticta Sands
Begonia malindangensis Merr.
Begonia malipoensis S.H.Huang & Y.M.Shui
Begonia malmquistiana Irmsch.
Begonia mamutensis Sands
Begonia mananjebensis Humbert
Begonia mangorensis Humbert
Begonia manhaoensis S.H.Huang & Y.M.Shui
Begonia manicata Brongn.
Begonia manillensis A.DC.
Begonia mannii Hook.f.
Begonia manuselaensis, endemic of Manusela National Park on karst lowland, Ceram Island
Begonia maracayuensis Parodi
Begonia mariae L.B.Sm.
Begonia mariannensis Wassh. & McClellan
Begonia mariti Burt-Utley
Begonia marnieri Keraudren
Begonia marojejyensis Humbert
Begonia martabanica A.DC.
Begonia masarangensis Irmsch.
Begonia mashanica D.Fang & D.H.Qin
Begonia masoalaensis M.Hughes
Begonia masoniana Irmsch. ex Ziesenh.
Begonia matogrossensis L.B.Sm. ex S.F.Sm. & Wassh.
Begonia mattos-silvae L.B.Sm. ex S.F.Sm. & Wassh.
Begonia matudae Burt-Utley & Utley
Begonia maurandiae A.DC.
Begonia maxima hort. ex Klotzsch
Begonia maxwelliana King
Begonia mayasiana L.B.Sm. & B.G.Schub.
Begonia maynensis A.DC.
Begonia mazae Ziesenh.
Begonia mbangaensis Sosef
Begonia mearnsii Merr.
Begonia media Merr. & L.M.Perry
Begonia medusae Linden
Begonia megacarpa Merr.
Begonia megalantha Merr.
Begonia megalophyllaria C.Y.Wu
Begonia megaptera A.DC.
Begonia mekonggensis Girm. & Wiriad.
Begonia melanobullata C.-I Peng & C. W. Lin.
Begonia melikopia Kiew
Begonia membranacea A.DC.
Begonia mendumae M.Hughes
Begonia menglianensis Y.Y.Qian
Begonia mengtzeana Irmsch.
Begonia meridensis A.DC.
Begonia meriraiensis S.Julia & Kiew
Begonia merrittii Merr.
Begonia mexicana G. Karst. ex Fotsch
Begonia meyeri-johannis Engl.
Begonia meysseliana Linden
Begonia michoacana L.B.Sm. & B.G.Schub.
Begonia micranthera Griseb.
Begonia microcarpa A.DC.
Begonia microptera Hook.f.
Begonia microsperma Warb.
Begonia mildbraedii Gilg
Begonia militaris L.B.Sm. & B.G.Schub.
Begonia mindanaensis Warb.
Begonia mindorensis Merr.
Begonia minicarpa H.Hara
Begonia minjemensis Irmsch.
Begonia minor Jacq.
Begonia minuta Sosef
Begonia minutiflora Sands
Begonia minutifolia N.Hallé
Begonia miranda Irmsch.
Begonia modestiflora Kurz
Begonia molinana Burt-Utley
Begonia molleri (C.DC.) Warb.
Begonia mollicaulis Irmsch.
Begonia mollis A.DC.
Begonia monadelpha (Klotzsch) Ruiz & Pav. ex A.DC.
Begonia monantha Warb.
Begonia monicae Aymonin & Bosser
Begonia monophylla Pav. ex A.DC.
Begonia montana (A.DC.) Warb.
Begonia montis-bismarckii Warb.
Begonia montis-elephantis J.J.de Wilde
Begonia mooreana (Irmsch.) L.L.Forrest & Hollingsw.
Begonia morelii Irmsch. ex Kareg.
Begonia morifolia T.T.Yu
Begonia morii Burt-Utley
Begonia morrisiorum Rekha Morris & P.D.McMillan
Begonia morsei Irmsch.
Begonia moszkowskii Irmsch.
Begonia moysesii Brade
Begonia mucronistipula C.DC.
Begonia muliensis T.T.Yu
Begonia multangula Blume
Begonia multibracteata Girm.
Begonia multidentata Warb.
Begonia multijugata M.Hughes
Begonia multinervia Liebm.
Begonia multistaminea Burt-Utley
Begonia muricata Blume
Begonia murina Craib
Begonia murudensis Merr.
Begonia mystacina L.B.Sm. & Wassh.
Begonia mysteriosa L.Kollmann & A.P.Fontana

N

Begonia nagaensis Kiew & S.Julia
Begonia nana L'Hér.
Begonia nantoensis M.J.Lai & N.J.Chung
Begonia napoensis L.B.Sm. & Wassh.
Begonia naumoniensis Irmsch.
Begonia neglecta A.DC.
Begonia negrosensis Elmer
Begonia nelumbiifolia Cham. & Schltdl.
Begonia nemoralis L.B.Sm. & B.G.Schub.
Begonia neocomensium A.DC.
Begonia neoharlingii L.B.Sm. & Wassh.
Begonia neoperrieri Humbert ex Aymonin & Bosser
Begonia neopurpurea L.B.Sm. & Wassh.
Begonia nepalensis (A.DC.) Warb.
Begonia nevadensis Dorr
Begonia niahensis K.G.Pearce
Begonia nigritarum Steud.
Begonia ningmingensis D.Fang, Y.G.Wei & C.I Peng
Begonia nivea Parish ex Kurz
Begonia nobmanniae D.C.Thomas & Ardi
Begonia nossibea A.DC.
Begonia notata Craib
Begonia notiophila Urb.
Begonia novalombardiensis L.Kollmann
Begonia novogranatae A.DC.
Begonia novoguineensis Merr. & L.M.Perry
Begonia nubicola L.B.Sm. & B.G.Schub.
Begonia nuda Irmsch.
Begonia nummulariifolia Putz.
Begonia nurii Irmsch.
Begonia nuwakotensis S.Rajbh.
Begonia nyassensis Irmsch.
Begonia nymphaeifolia T.T.Yu

O

Begonia oaxacana A.DC.
Begonia oblanceolata Rusby
Begonia obliqua L.
Begonia obliquifolia S.H.Huang & Y.M.Shui
Begonia oblongata Merr.
Begonia oblongifolia Stapf
Begonia obovatistipula C.DC.
Begonia obovoidea Craib
Begonia obscura Brade
Begonia obsolescens Irmsch.
Begonia obtecticaulis Irmsch.
Begonia obtusifolia Merr.
Begonia obversa C.B.Clarke
Begonia occhionii Brade
Begonia octopetala L'Hér.
Begonia odeteiantha Handro
Begonia oellgaardii L.B.Sm. & Wassh.
Begonia olbia Kerch.
Begonia oligandra Merr. & L.M.Perry
Begonia oligantha Merr.
Begonia oligophylla Blume ex Miq.
Begonia oliveri L.B.Sm. & B.G.Schub.
Begonia olsoniae L.B.Sm. & B.G.Schub.
Begonia ophiogyna L.B.Sm. & B.G.Schub.
Begonia opuliflora Putz.
Begonia orbiculata Jack
Begonia orchidiflora Griff.
Begonia oreodoxa Chun & F.Chun
Begonia oreophila Kiew
Begonia organensis Brade
Begonia ornithocarpa Standl.
Begonia ornithophylla Irmsch.
Begonia otophora Merr. & L.M.Perry
Begonia otophylla L.B.Sm. & B.G.Schub.
Begonia ovatifolia A.DC.
Begonia oxyanthera Warb.
Begonia oxyloba Welw. ex Hook.f.
Begonia oxysperma A.DC.
Begonia oxyura Merr. & L.M.Perry
Begonia ozotothrix D.C.Thomas

P

Begonia pachyrhachis L.B.Sm. & Wassh.
Begonia padangensis Irmsch.
Begonia paganuccii Gregório & J.A.S. Costa
Begonia palawanensis Merr.
Begonia paleacea Kurz
Begonia paleata A.DC.
Begonia palmata D.Don
Begonia palmeri S.Watson
Begonia panayensis Merr.
Begonia panchtharensis S.Rajbh.
Begonia paniculata Parodi
Begonia pantherina Putz. ex Linden
Begonia paoana Kiew & S.Julia
Begonia papuana Warb.
Begonia papyraptera Sands
Begonia paraguayensis Parodi
Begonia paranaensis Brade
Begonia parcifolia C.DC.
Begonia parilis Irmsch.
Begonia parishii C.B.Clarke
Begonia parodiana L.B.Sm. & B.G.Schub.
Begonia parva Merr.
Begonia parviflora Poepp. & Endl.
Begonia parvifolia Schott
Begonia parvilimba Merr.
Begonia parvistipulata Irmsch.
Begonia parvula H.Lév. & Vaniot
Begonia parvuliflora A.DC.
Begonia pasamanensis M.Hughes
Begonia pastoensis A.DC.
Begonia paucilobata C.Y.Wu
Begonia paulensis A.DC.
Begonia paupercula King
Begonia pavonina Ridl.
Begonia payung S.Julia & Kiew
Begonia pearcei Hook.f.
Begonia pectennervia L.B.Sm. & Wassh.
Begonia pedata Liebm.
Begonia pedatifida H.Lév.
Begonia pediophylla Merr. & L.M.Perry
Begonia pedunculosa Wall.
Begonia peekelii Irmsch.
Begonia peii C.Y.Wu
Begonia pelargoniiflora J.J.de Wilde & J.C.Arends
Begonia peltata Otto & Dietr.
Begonia peltatifolia Li
Begonia peltifolia Schott
Begonia peltigera Irmsch.
Begonia pendula Ridl.
Begonia pengii S.M.Ku & Yan Liu
Begonia pennellii L.B.Sm. & B.G.Schub.
Begonia penrissenensis Kiew & S.Julia
Begonia pensilis L.B.Sm. & Wassh.
Begonia pentaphragmifolia Ridl.
Begonia pentaphylla Walp.
Begonia peperomioides Hook.f.
Begonia perakensis King
Begonia per-dusenii Brade
Begonia peristegia Stapf
Begonia pernambucensis Brade
Begonia perpusilla A.DC.
Begonia perrieri Bois
Begonia perryae L.B.Sm. & Wassh.
Begonia peruibensis Handro
Begonia peruviana A.DC.
Begonia petasitifolia Brade
Begonia phamiana Kiew
Begonia philodendroides Ziesenh.
Begonia phoeniogramma Ridl.
Begonia phrixophylla Blatt. & McCann
Begonia phuthoensis H.Q.Nguyen
Begonia phyllomaniaca Mart.
Begonia physandra Merr. & L.M.Perry
Begonia pickelii Irmsch.
Begonia picta Sm.
Begonia picturata Yan Liu, S.M.Ku & C.I Peng
Begonia pierrei Gagnep.
Begonia pilgeriana Irmsch.
Begonia pilosa Jack
Begonia pilosella Irmsch.
Begonia pinetorum A.DC.
Begonia pinglinensis C.I Peng
Begonia pinheironis L.B.Sm. ex S.F.Sm. & Wassh.
Begonia pinnatifida Merr. & L.M.Perry
Begonia piresiana Handro
Begonia piring Kiew & S.Julia
Begonia piurensis L.B.Sm. & B.G.Schub.
Begonia plantaginea L.B.Sm. & B.G.Schub.
Begonia platanifolia Schott
Begonia platycarpa Y.M.Shui & W.H.Chen
Begonia platyphylla Merr.
Begonia platyptera Urb.
Begonia plebeja Liebm.
Begonia pleioclada Irmsch.
Begonia pleiopetala A.DC.
Begonia plumieri Kunth
Begonia pluvialis L.B.Sm. ex S.F.Sm. & Wassh.
Begonia poculifera Hook.f.
Begonia poilanei Kiew
Begonia polilloensis Tebbitt
Begonia polyandra Irmsch.
Begonia polygonata Liebm.
Begonia polygonifolia A.DC.
Begonia polygonoides Hook.f.
Begonia polypetala A.DC.
Begonia polytricha C.Y.Wu
Begonia popenoei Standl.
Begonia porteana Van Geert
Begonia porteri H.Lév. & Vaniot
Begonia portillana S.Watson
Begonia postarii Kiew
Begonia potamophila Gilg
Begonia praerupta Irmsch.
Begonia praetermissa Kiew
Begonia preussii Warb.
Begonia prieurii A.DC.
Begonia princeae Gilg
Begonia princeps (Klotzsch) A.DC.
Begonia pringlei S.Watson
Begonia prionophylla Irmsch.
Begonia prionota D.C.Thomas & Ardi
Begonia prismatocarpa Hook.
Begonia procridifolia Wall. ex A.DC.
Begonia prolifera A.DC.
Begonia prolixa Craib
Begonia promethea Ridl.
Begonia propinqua Ridl.
Begonia pruinata (Klotzsch) A.DC.
Begonia pryeriana Ridl.
Begonia pseudodaedalea P.D.McMillan & Rekha Morris
Begonia pseudodaxinensis S.M.Ku, Yan Liu & C.I Peng
Begonia pseudodryadis C.Y.Wu
Begonia pseudoglauca Irmsch.
Begonia pseudolateralis Warb.
Begonia pseudoleprosa C.I Peng, Yan Liu & S.M.Ku
Begonia pseudolubbersii Brade
Begonia pseudomuricata Girm.
Begonia pseudoviola Gilg
Begonia psilophylla Irmsch.
Begonia pteridiformis Phutthai
Begonia pubescens Ridl.
Begonia pudica L.B.Sm. & B.G.Schub.
Begonia pulchella Raddi
Begonia pulcherrima Sosef
Begonia pulchra (Ridl.) L.L.Forrest & Hollingsw.
Begonia pululahuana C.DC.
Begonia pulvinifera C.I Peng & Yan Liu
Begonia pumila Craib
Begonia pumilio Irmsch.
Begonia punbatuensis Kiew
Begonia punchak Kiew & S.Julia
Begonia purdieana A.DC.
Begonia purpureofolia S.H.Huang & Y.M.Shui
Begonia purpusii Houghton ex Ziesenh.
Begonia puspitae Ardi
Begonia pustulata Liebm.
Begonia puttii Craib
Begonia pycnantha Urb. & Ekman
Begonia pygmaea Irmsch.
Begonia pyrrha Ridl.

Q

Begonia quadrialata Warb.
Begonia quaternata L.B.Sm. & B.G.Schub.
Begonia quercifolia A.DC.
Begonia quinquealata C.I Peng & Rubite & C.W.Lin

R

Begonia rabilii Craib
Begonia racemiflora Ortgies ex C.Chev.
Begonia racemosa Jack
Begonia rachmatii Tebbitt
Begonia radicans Vell.
Begonia rafael-torresii Burt-Utley
Begonia raimondii Irmsch.
Begonia rajah Ridl.
Begonia ramentacea Paxton
Begonia ramosii Merr.
Begonia randiana Merr. & L.M.Perry
Begonia rantemarioensis D.C.Thomas & Ardi
Begonia ravenii C.I.Peng & Y.K.Chen
Begonia razafinjohanyi Aymonin & Bosser
Begonia reflexisquamosa C.Y.Wu
Begonia reginula Kiew
Begonia × reichenheimii G. Bartsch
Begonia relicta L.B.Sm. & B.G.Schub.
Begonia renifolia Irmsch.
Begonia reniformis Dryand.
Begonia repens Lam.
Begonia repenticaulis Irmsch.
Begonia retinervia D.Fang, D.H.Qin & C.I Peng
Begonia retusa O.E.Schulz
Begonia rex Putz.
Begonia rheifolia Irmsch.
Begonia rhizocaulis (Klotzsch) A.DC.
Begonia rhodantha Ridl.
Begonia rhodochaeta S.Julia & Kiew
Begonia rhodochlamys L.B.Sm. & B.G.Schub.
Begonia rhodophylla C.Y.Wu
Begonia rhoephila Ridl.
Begonia rhyacophila Kiew
Begonia rhynchocarpa Y.M.Shui & W.H.Chen
Begonia rieckei Warb.
Begonia riedelii A.DC.
Begonia rigida (Klotzsch) Regel ex A.DC.
Begonia rimarum Craib
Begonia riparia Irmsch.
Begonia rizalensis Merr.
Begonia robinsonii Ridl.
Begonia robusta Blume
Begonia rockii Irmsch.
Begonia roezlii Regel
Begonia rongjiangensis T.C.Ku
Begonia rosacea Putz.
Begonia roseibractea Ziesenh.
Begonia rossmanniae A.DC.
Begonia rostrata Welw. ex Hook.f.
Begonia rotunda Vell.
Begonia rotundifolia Lam.
Begonia rotundilimba S.H.Huang & Y.M.Shui
Begonia roxburghii A.DC.
Begonia rubella Buch.-Ham. ex D.Don
Begonia rubellina L.H. Bailey
Begonia rubida Ridl.
Begonia rubiginosipes Irmsch.
Begonia rubinea Hong Z.Li & H.Ma
Begonia rubiteae M.Hughes
Begonia ruboides C.M.Hu
Begonia rubricaulis Hook.
Begonia rubriflora L.Kollmann
Begonia rubrifolia Merr.
Begonia rubromarginata Gilg
Begonia rubronervata De Wild.
Begonia rubropilosa A.DC.
Begonia rubropunctata S.H.Huang & Y.M.Shui
Begonia rubroracteolata S.Julia & C.Y.Ling
Begonia rubrotincta L.B.Sm. & B.G.Schub.
Begonia rufa Thunb.
Begonia rufipila Merr.
Begonia rufosericea Toledo
Begonia ruhlandiana Irmsch.
Begonia rumpiensis Kupicha
Begonia rupium Irmsch.
Begonia ruschii L.Kollmann
Begonia russelliana L.B.Sm. ex S.F.Sm. & Wassh.
Begonia rutilans (Klotzsch) A.DC.
Begonia rwandensis J.C.Arends

S

Begonia sabahensis Kiew & J.H.Tan
Begonia salaziensis (Gaudich.) Warb.
Begonia salesopolensis S.J.Gomes da Silva & Mamede
Begonia salisburyana Irmsch.
Begonia salomonensis Merr. & L.M.Perry
Begonia samarensis Merr.
Begonia sambiranensis Humbert ex Aymonin & Bosser
Begonia samhaensis M.Hughes & A.G.Mill.
Begonia sandalifolia C.B.Clarke
Begonia sandtii Houghton ex Ziesenh.
Begonia sanguinea Raddi
Begonia sanguineopilosa D.C.Thomas & Ardi
Begonia santarosensis Kuntze
Begonia santos-limae Brade
Begonia sarangica Kiew & S.Julia
Begonia sarasinorum Irmsch.
Begonia sarawakensis Ridl.
Begonia sarcocarpa Ridl.
Begonia sarmentosa L.B.Sm. & Wassh.
Begonia sartorii Liebm.
Begonia satrapis C.B.Clarke
Begonia saxicola A.DC.
Begonia saxifraga A.DC.
Begonia saxifragifolia Craib
Begonia scabrida A.DC.
Begonia scapigera Hook.f.
Begonia schaeferi Engl.
Begonia scharffii Hook.f.
Begonia schliebenii Irmsch.
Begonia schlumbergeriana Lem.
Begonia schulziana Urb. & Ekman
Begonia sciadiophora L.B.Sm. & B.G.Schub.
Begonia sciaphila Gilg ex Engl.
Begonia scintillans Dunn
Begonia scitifolia Irmsch.
Begonia scortechinii King
Begonia scottii Tebbitt
Begonia scutifolia Hook.f.
Begonia scutulum Hook.f.
Begonia secunda L.B.Sm. & Wassh.
Begonia seemanniana A.DC.
Begonia segregata L.B.Sm. & B.G.Schub.
Begonia semidigitata Brade
Begonia semiovata Liebm.
Begonia semiparietalis Yan Liu, S.M.Ku & C.I Peng
Begonia serapatensis Kiew & S.Julia
Begonia sericoneura Liebm.
Begonia serotina A.DC.
Begonia serpens Merr.
Begonia serranegrae L.B.Sm. ex S.F.Sm. & Wassh.
Begonia serraticauda Merr. & L.M.Perry
Begonia serratipetala Irmsch.
Begonia sessilifolia Hook.f.
Begonia setifolia Irmsch.
Begonia setulosa Bertol.
Begonia setulosopeltata C.Y.Wu
Begonia seychellensis Hemsl.
Begonia sharpeana F.Muell.
Begonia siamensis Gagnep.
Begonia sibthorpioides Ridl.
Begonia sibutensis Sands
Begonia siccacaudata J.Door.
Begonia sikkimensis A.DC.
Begonia silhetensis (A.DC.) C.B.Clarke
Begonia simulans Merr. & L.M.Perry
Begonia sinobrevicaulis T.C.Ku
Begonia sinofloribunda Dorr
Begonia sinovietnamica C.Y.Wu
Begonia sinuata Wall. ex Meisn.
Begonia sizemoreae Kiew
Begonia sleumeri L.B.Sm. & B.G.Schub.
Begonia smilacina A.DC.
Begonia smithiae Geddes
Begonia smithiana T.T.Yu ex Irmsch.
Begonia socia Craib
Begonia socotrana Hook.f.
Begonia sodiroi C.DC.
Begonia sogerensis Ridl.
Begonia solananthera A.DC.
Begonia solimutata L.B.Sm. & Wassh.
Begonia solitudinis Brade
Begonia soluta Craib
Begonia somervillei Hemsl.
Begonia sonderiana Irmsch.
Begonia soror Irmsch.
Begonia sorsogonensis Elmer ex Merr.
Begonia sosefiana J.J.de Wilde & Valk.
Begonia sousae Burt-Utley
Begonia spadiciflora L.B.Sm. & B.G.Schub.
Begonia sparreana L.B.Sm. & Wassh.
Begonia sparsipila Baker
Begonia speluncae Ridl.
Begonia sphenocarpa Irmsch.
Begonia spilotophylla F.Muell.
Begonia spinibarbis Irmsch.
Begonia squamipes Irmsch.
Begonia squamulosa Hook.f.
Begonia squarrosa Liebm.
Begonia staudtii Gilg
Begonia stellata Sosef
Begonia stenocardia L.B.Sm. & B.G.Schub.
Begonia stenogyna Sands
Begonia stenolepis L.B.Sm. & R.C.Sm.
Begonia stenophylla A.DC.
Begonia stenotepala L.B.Sm. & B.G.Schub.
Begonia stevei M.Hughes
Begonia steyermarkii L.B.Sm. & B.G.Schub.
Begonia stichochaete K.G.Pearce
Begonia stictopoda (Miq.) Miq. ex A.DC.
Begonia stigmosa Lindl.
Begonia stilandra Merr. & L.M.Perry
Begonia stipulacea Willd.
Begonia stolzii Irmsch.
Begonia strachwitzii Warb. ex Irmsch.
Begonia strictinervis Irmsch.
Begonia strictipetiolaris Irmsch.
Begonia strigillosa A.Dietr.
Begonia strigosa (Warb.) L.L.Forrest & Hollingsw.
Begonia strigulosa (Hassk.) A.DC.
Begonia subacida Irmsch.
Begonia subalpestris A.Chev.
Begonia subcaudata Rusby ex L.B.Sm. & Schub.
Begonia subciliata A.DC.
Begonia subcoriacea C.I Peng, Yan Liu & S.M.Ku
Begonia subcostata Rusby
Begonia subcyclophylla Irmsch.
Begonia subelliptica Merr. & L.M.Perry
Begonia subhowii S.H.Huang
Begonia subisensis K.G.Pearce
Begonia sublobata Jack
Begonia sublongipes Y.M.Shui
Begonia subnummularifolia Merr.
Begonia suboblata D.Fang & D.H.Qin
Begonia suborbiculata Merr.
Begonia subpeltata Wight
Begonia subperfoliata Parish ex Kurz
Begonia subprostrata Merr.
Begonia subscutata De Wild.
Begonia subspinulosa Irmsch.
Begonia subtruncata Merr.
Begonia subvillosa Klotzsch
Begonia subviridis Craib
Begonia sudjanae C.-A.Jansson
Begonia suffrutescens Merr. & L.M.Perry
Begonia summoglabra T.T.Yu
Begonia sunorchis C.Chev.
Begonia suprafastigiata Irmsch.
Begonia surculigera Kurz
Begonia susaniae Sosef
Begonia sutherlandii Hook.f.
Begonia sychnantha L.B.Sm. & Wassh.
Begonia sylvatica A.DC.
Begonia sylvestris A.DC.
Begonia symbeccarii L.L.Forrest & Hollingsw.
Begonia symbracteosa L.L.Forrest & Hollingsw.
Begonia symgeraniifolia L.L.Forrest & Hollingsw.
Begonia symhirta L.L.Forrest & Hollingsw.
Begonia sympapuana L.L.Forrest & Hollingsw.
Begonia symparvifolia L.L.Forrest & Hollingsw.
Begonia sympodialis Irmsch.
Begonia symsanguinea L.L.Forrest & Hollingsw.

T

Begonia tabonensis C.I Peng & Rubite & C.W.Lin
Begonia tacana Ziesenh.
Begonia tafaensis Merr. & L.M.Perry
Begonia tafiensis Lillo
Begonia × taipeiensis C.I.Peng
Begonia taiwaniana Hayata
Begonia taliensis Gagnep.
Begonia taligera S.Rajbh.
Begonia tambelanensis (Irmsch.) Kiew
Begonia tampinica Burkill ex Irmsch.
Begonia tanala Humbert
Begonia tapatia Burt-Utley & McVaugh
Begonia tarokoensis M.J.Lai
Begonia tatoniana R.Wilczek
Begonia tawaensis Merr.
Begonia tayabensis Merr.
Begonia tayloriana Irmsch.
Begonia temburongensis Sands
Begonia tenera Dryand.
Begonia tenericaulis Ridl.
Begonia tengchiana C.I Peng & Y.K.Chen
Begonia tenuibracteata C.I Peng & Rubite & C.W.Lin      
Begonia tenuicaulis A.DC.
Begonia tenuifolia Dryand.
Begonia tessaricarpa C.B.Clarke
Begonia tetralobata Y.M.Shui
Begonia tetrandra Irmsch.
Begonia teuscheri Linden ex André
Begonia teysmanniana (Miq.) Miq. ex B.D.Jacks.
Begonia thaipingensis King
Begonia thelmae L.B.Sm. & Wassh.
Begonia thiemei C.DC.
Begonia thomeana C.DC.
Begonia thomsonii A.DC.
Begonia thyrsoidea Irmsch.
Begonia tigrina Kiew
Begonia tiliifolia C.DC.
Begonia timorensis (Miq.) Golding & Kareg.
Begonia tiomanensis Ridl.
Begonia toledana L.B.Sm. & B.G.Schub.
Begonia toledoana Handro
Begonia tomentosa Schott
Begonia tominana Golding
Begonia tonduzii C.DC. ex T.Durand & Pittier
Begonia tonkinensis Gagnep.
Begonia torajana D.C.Thomas & Ardi
Begonia torricellensis Warb.
Begonia trianae (A.DC.) Warb.
Begonia tribenensis C.R.Rao
Begonia tribracteata Irmsch.
Begonia trichocarpa Dalzell
Begonia trichochila Warb.
Begonia trichopoda (Miq.) Miq.
Begonia trichosepala C.DC. ex Donn.Sm.
Begonia tricuspidata C.B.Clarke
Begonia trigonocarpa Ridl.
Begonia triradiata C.B.Clarke
Begonia triramosa Irmsch.
Begonia trispathulata (A.DC.) Warb.
Begonia tropaeolifolia A.DC.
Begonia trujillensis L.B.Sm.
Begonia trullifolia Guillaumin
Begonia truncatiloba Irmsch.
Begonia truncicola Sodiro ex C.DC.
Begonia tsaii Irmsch.
Begonia tsaratananensis Aymonin & Bosser
Begonia tsimihety Humbert
Begonia tsoongii C.Y.Wu
Begonia tuberculosa Girm.
Begonia tumbezensis Irmsch.
Begonia turbinata Ridl.
Begonia turrialbae Burt-Utley & Utley

U

Begonia udisilvestris C.DC.
Begonia ulmifolia Willd.
Begonia umbellata Kunth
Begonia umbraculifera Hook.f.
Begonia umbraculifolia Y.Wan & B.N.Chang
Begonia unduavensis Rusby
Begonia undulata Schott
Begonia uniflora S.Watson
Begonia unilateralia Rusby
Begonia urdanetensis Elmer
Begonia urophylla Hook.
Begonia ursina L.B.Sm. & B.G.Schub.
Begonia urticae L.f.
Begonia uruapensis Sessé & Moc.
Begonia urunensis Kiew

V

Begonia vaccinioides Sands
Begonia vagans Craib
Begonia valdensium A.DC.
Begonia valida Goebel
Begonia vallicola Kiew
Begonia valvata L.B.Sm. & B.G.Schub.
Begonia vanderckhovenii De Wild.
Begonia vanderichoveni De Wild.
Begonia vandewateri Ridl.
Begonia vanoverberghii Merr.
Begonia vareschii Irmsch.
Begonia variabilis Ridl.
Begonia variegata Y.M.Shui & W.H.Chen
Begonia variifolia Y.M.Shui & W.H.Chen
Begonia varipeltata D.C.Thomas
Begonia varistyle Irmsch.
Begonia veitchii Hook.f.
Begonia velata L.B.Sm. & B.G.Schub.
Begonia vellozoana Walp.
Begonia venosa Skan ex Hook.f.
Begonia venusta King
Begonia verecunda M.Hughes
Begonia vermeulenii D.C.Thomas
Begonia verruculosa L.B.Sm.
Begonia versicolor Irmsch.
Begonia vestita C.DC.
Begonia vicina Irmsch.
Begonia vietnamensis H.Q.Nguyen & C.I Peng
Begonia villifolia Irmsch.
Begonia vincentina O.E.Schulz
Begonia violifolia A.DC.
Begonia viridiflora A.DC.
Begonia viscida Ziesenh.
Begonia vitiensis A.C.Sm.
Begonia vittariifolia N.Hallé

W

Begonia wadei Merr. & Quisumb.
Begonia wageneriana (Klotzsch) Hook.
Begonia wakefieldii Gilg ex Engl.
Begonia wallichiana Lehm.
Begonia walteriana Irmsch.
Begonia wangii T.T.Yu
Begonia warburgii K.Schum. & Lauterb.
Begonia wariana Irmsch.
Begonia wattii C.B.Clarke
Begonia watuwilensis Girm.
Begonia weberbaueri Irmsch.
Begonia weberi Merr.
Begonia weberlingii Irmsch. ex Weberling
Begonia weddeliana A.DC.
Begonia weigallii Hemsl.
Begonia wengeri C.E.C.Fisch.
Begonia wenshanensis C.M.Hu
Begonia wilkiei Coyle
Begonia wilksii Sosef
Begonia wilsonii Gagnep.
Begonia windischii L.B.Sm. ex S.F.Sm. & Wassh.
Begonia wollastonii Baker f.
Begonia wollnyi Herzog
Begonia woodii Merr.
Begonia wrayi Hemsl.
Begonia wrightiana A.DC.
Begonia wurdackii L.B.Sm. & B.G.Schub.
Begonia wutaiana C.I Peng & Y.K.Chen
Begonia wyepingiana Kiew

X

Begonia xanthina Hook.
Begonia xerophyta L.B.Sm. & Wassh.
Begonia xilitlensis Burt-Utley
Begonia xingyiensis T.C.Ku
Begonia xiphophylla Irmsch.
Begonia xishuiensis T.C.Ku
Begonia xylopoda L.B.Sm. & B.G.Schub.

Y

Begonia yappii Ridl.
Begonia yingjiangensis S.H.Huang
Begonia yishanensis T.C.Ku
Begonia ynesiae L.B.Sm. & Wassh.
Begonia yui Irmsch.
Begonia yunckeri Standl.
Begonia yazeedrana yombex.

Z

Begonia zairensis Sosef
Begonia zamboangensis Merr.
Begonia zenkeriana L.B.Sm. & Wassh.
Begonia zhangii D.Fang & D.H.Qin
Begonia zhengyiana Y.M.Shui
Begonia zimmermannii Peter ex Irmsch.
Begonia zollingeriana (Klotzsch) A.DC.

References 

List
Begonia